Amandine Bourgeois (born 12 June 1979, in Angoulême, Charente) is a French singer. She was the winner of the sixth edition of the French version of the Pop Idol series Nouvelle Star in 2008. On 26 July 2014, Bourgeois participated in the television game show Fort Boyard.

Eurovision Song Contest 2013

Le Parisien announced on 22 January 2013, that Bourgeois would represent France at the Eurovision Song Contest 2013 in Malmö, Sweden, with the song "L'enfer et moi", coming 23rd in the final.

Discography

Albums

Singles

As lead artist

As featured artist

Other charted songs

References

1979 births
Living people
People from Angoulême
Nouvelle Star winners
Articles containing video clips
Eurovision Song Contest entrants for France
Eurovision Song Contest entrants of 2013
21st-century French singers
21st-century French women singers